The Sumatran water shrew (Chimarrogale sumatrana) is a red-toothed shrew found only in the Padang highlands of western Sumatra, Indonesia. Its natural habitats are streams in montane forests. The species is only known from a holotype, which is damaged, and was previously listed as critically endangered by IUCN. It is believed to be severely threatened by habitat loss.

References

External links
 
 

Chimarrogale
Endemic fauna of Indonesia
Shrew, Sumatran Water
Shrew, Sumatran Water
Shrew, Sumatran Water
Mammals described in 1921
Taxa named by Oldfield Thomas